This is the list of episodes for The Tonight Show Starring Jimmy Fallon in 2017.

2017

January

February

March

April

May

June

July

August

September

October

November

December

External links
 
 Lineups at Interbridge 

Episodes 2017
Lists of American non-fiction television series episodes
Lists of variety television series episodes
2017 American television seasons